Karl Stegger (11 January 1913, in Aarhus – 13 April 1980, in Frederiksberg) was a Danish actor, who appeared in 157 films which makes him the second-most used Danish film actor after Ove Sprogøe.

He mostly appeared in comedy, but also had some serious roles e.g. as the vicar in Præsten i Vejlby (based on the Steen Steensen Blicher drama). He became famous in 1955 when he replaced Ib Schønberg as the father in the popular Far-til-Fire-film series (Father of Four). Later he appeared in several of the Olsen-banden-movies and the TV series Matador as Consul Holm.

Selected filmography
 The Crime of Tove Andersen (1953)
 The Son (1953)
 Paw (1959)
 Neighbours (1966)

References

External links 
 

1913 births
1980 deaths
Danish male film actors
People from Aarhus
20th-century Danish male actors